"Move This" is a song by Belgian electronic music project Technotronic featuring Ya Kid K. Recorded in 1989 and appearing on Technotronic's debut album, Pump Up the Jam: The Album (1989), the song was re-recorded and included on The Greatest Hits (1993). It peaked at No. 6 on the Billboard Hot 100, becoming her 3rd and last top 10 hit. "Move This" is featured in the motion picture Let's Go to Prison, starring Will Arnett and Dax Shepard, and the King of the Hill episode "Dances with Dogs".

Critical reception
In 1992, Larry Flick from Billboard wrote that the "pop-juiced hip-houser was first heard on Technotronic's Pump Up the Jam album a couple of years ago. Resurrection via a Revlon TV commercial has sparked heavy pop radio interest. Ya Kid K's rhymes are appropriately cute'n'clever, and the beats and melody are strong enough to withstand heavy competition." BuzzFeed placed it at number 35 in their list of "The 101 Greatest Dance Songs of the '90s" in 2017. Harry Sumrall from Knight Ridder felt it has "the female-group sound of the '60s with a house update". Diana Valois from The Morning Call described it as "a sunny blend of subtle African world beat and house music". Pop Rescue deemed it "a fairly mid-tempo bouncy track", adding that Ya Kid K's vocals and lyrics "lack the power and catchiness of the earlier songs."

Charts

References

1989 songs
1992 singles
Technotronic songs
SBK Records singles
Songs written by Jo Bogaert